Tin Hau is an area in Wan Chai District, on the north side of Hong Kong Island, in Hong Kong.

Tin Hau is not a formalised district in Hong Kong, but rather Causeway Bay proper. The colloquial name arose from Tin Hau station, so named due to its proximity to the Causeway Bay Tin Hau Temple; and as the use of the name Causeway Bay shifts eastwards due to Causeway Bay Tram Terminus and later Causeway Bay station.

The term "Tin Hau" is also used to describe the location of places like Queen's College (beside Tin Hau MTR station) and the Central Library and the Causeway Bay Sports Ground which is located in the Wan Chai District. Several government offices and facilities such as Causeway Bay Market are located there.

Places in Causeway Bay (Tin Hau)

Streets
 Electric Road
 King's Road (partially)

Public facilities
 Hong Kong Central Library (Tin Hau MTR Exit B's name)
 Victoria Park (Tin Hau MTR Exit A's name)
 Causeway Bay Sports Ground
 Causeway Bay Market (No. 142 Electric Road)
 Causeway Bay Community Centre

Hotels
 L'hotel Causeway Bay Harbour View
 Causeway Bay Metro Park Hotel
 TUVE

Schools
Queen's College (The first boys school in Hong Kong)
Belilios Public School (The first girls school in Hong Kong. This school is still in Eastern District, as it was excluded from a constituency boundaries change from Eastern District to Wan Chai District in 2016.)
 Causeway Bay Victoria Kindergarten and International Nursery (A IB International Kindergarten)

Estates
The Pavilla Hill
Park Towers
Dragon Court

Others
 Tin Hau Temple
 Ngo Wong Temple (No. 150-160 Electric Road)

Transportation
 Tin Hau is served by the Tin Hau MTR station. 
 There are multiple buses and the Hong Kong tramway
 Tin Hau is also walking distance away from nearby Fortress Hill and Causeway Bay station

See also
 Tin Hau (constituency)

References

 
Wan Chai District